Mario George Bratu (born 7 June 2002) is a Romanian professional footballer who plays as an attacking midfielder or a winger for Liga I club Petrolul Ploiești.

Club career
Bratu made his professional debut for his boyhood club Petrolul Ploiești on 18 July 2022, in a 0–1 Liga I loss to Voluntari. He scored his first goal in the competition on 27 February 2023, in a 2–5 home loss to defending champions CFR Cluj.

Honours
Petrolul Ploiești
Liga II: 2021–22

References

External links
Mario Bratu at Liga Profesionistă de Fotbal 

2002 births
Living people
Sportspeople from Ploiești
Romanian footballers
Association football midfielders
Association football wingers
Liga I players
Liga II players
FC Petrolul Ploiești players
Romania youth international footballers